Alexander Fathoullin (born August 26, 1995) is a Canadian short-track speed skater. He won world championship and World Cup medals.

References

External links

1995 births
Living people
Canadian male short track speed skaters
People from Iqaluit
Sportspeople from Nunavut
World Short Track Speed Skating Championships medalists